Horizon Lines, Inc. was an American domestic ocean shipping and logistics company headquartered in Charlotte, North Carolina. It was the largest Jones Act maritime shipping and logistics company and accounted for approximately 37% of all US container shipments linking the continental United States to Alaska, Hawaii and Puerto Rico. Under the Jones Act, maritime shipments between US ports is restricted to US-built, owned, and flagged vessels operated by predominantly US-citizen crews.  The company originated from Sea-Land Service, Inc.  The domestic liner operations of Sea-Land were sold in 2003 and thereafter operated under the name Horizon Lines.  Horizon became a publicly traded company on the New York Stock Exchange in 2005.  In 2015 the company was acquired by Matson Navigation Company.

Scope of operations
Horizon owned a fleet of 13 Jones Act container ships as recently as 2014,approximately 31,000 cargo containers, and operated cargo terminals in Alaska, Hawaii, and Puerto Rico. Approximately 150 port calls were made each year in Tacoma, Washington for service between Alaska or Hawaii. Until November 2011, the company ran trans-Pacific service to Guam and China. It also contracted for terminal services in seven ports in the continental United States.  The primary customers were consumer and industrial products companies, as well as various agencies of the U.S. government including the Department of Defense and the U.S. Postal Service. It also offered shipping services of vehicles and household belongings.

Horizon met with criticism within the investor community due to the age of some of its vessels. In the world fleet container ships go to the scrap yard at age 28 while Horizon still maintained C6 and C7 Lancer Class steam powered vessels. One such vessel, SS Horizon Discovery (ex-American Liberty), was built in 1968 for the now defunct United States Lines.

Department of Justice controversy and litigation
In May 2011 the US Dept. of Justice reduced the fine levied the previous month after the company pleaded guilty to price fixing in the Puerto Rico market from $45m to $15m. The reduction was attributed to pressure from bondholders and the possibility that Horizon would declare bankruptcy after losing a contract with Danish shipping group Maersk Line.  
In October 2011, the company completed a $653m refinancing move to avoid bankruptcy.  On October 20, 2011 the New York Stock Exchange suspended trading of Horizon’s stock because it had fallen below its $15m continued listing standard for average global market capitalization over a consecutive 30-day trading period.  The company stock then traded on the OTCQB market. 
In November 2011, the company agreed to settle with the remaining shippers who opted out of the "Puerto Rico direct purchaser antitrust class action settlement" for $13.75m   28 January 2012, the company reached an agreement with the U.S. Department of Justice to plead guilty to two counts of providing falsified oil record-keeping documents from a vessel in the US West Coast-Hawaii service. The company paid a fine of $1.0 million and donated an additional $500,000 to the National Fish & Wildlife Foundation.  The company agreed to be placed on probation for three years and to institute an environmental compliance plan.

Company sale and close of operations
In November 2014 Horizon Lines announced that it had reached formal agreements to sell the entire company. Alaska operations were bought by Matson, Inc. for $469 million while, following regulatory approval, its Hawaii trade-lane business were acquired by The Pasha Group. Service to Puerto Rico ended in December 2014. The company cited continued losses and struggles to operate and maintain its steam-powered fleet. The company had previously reduced its Puerto Rico service in an effort to reduce costs.  The sale of the last part of the company was finalized on 29 May 2015.

References

External links
 official  website

Defunct shipping companies of the United States
Defunct companies based in North Carolina
Transport companies established in 1956
American companies disestablished in 2015
1956 establishments in North Carolina
2015 disestablishments in North Carolina
Economy of Anchorage, Alaska
American companies established in 1956